The Roman Catholic Diocese of Garanhuns is a diocese located in the city of Garanhuns in the Ecclesiastical province of Olinda e Recife in Brazil.

History
 August 2, 1918: Established as Diocese of Garanhuns from the Metropolitan Archdiocese of Olinda e Recife

Bishops
 Bishops of Garanhuns (Roman rite), in reverse chronological order
 Bishop Paulo Jackson Nóbrega de Sousa (2015-05.20 - present)
 Bishop Fernando José Monteiro Guimarães, C.Ss.R. (2008.03.12 – 2014.08.06), appointed Bishop of Brazil, Military
 Bishop Irineu Roque Scherer (1998.04.15 – 2007.05.30), appointed Bishop of Joinville, Santa Catarina 
 Bishop Tiago Postma (1974.06.20 – 1995.03.15)
 Bishop Milton Corrêa Pereira (1967.08.04 – 1973.04.25), appointed Coadjutor Archbishop of Manaus, Amazonas
 Bishop José Adelino Dantas (1958.05.03 – 1967.02.20), appointed Bishop of Ruy Barbosa (Rui Barbosa), Bahia
 Bishop Francisco Expedito Lopes (1954.08.24 – 1957.07.01)
 Bishop Juvéncio de Brito (1945.12.15 – 1954.01.31)
 Bishop Mário de Miranda Villas-Boas (1938.05.26 – 1944.09.10), appointed Archbishop of Belém do Pará
 Bishop Manoel Antônio de Paiva (1929.04.02 – 1937.05.19)
 Bishop João Tavares de Moura (1919.07.03 – 1928.07.20)

Other priest of this diocese who became bishop
José Luiz Gomes de Vasconcelos, appointed Auxiliary Bishop of Fortaleza, Ceara

References
 GCatholic.org
 Catholic Hierarchy
 Diocese website (Portuguese)

Roman Catholic dioceses in Brazil
Christian organizations established in 1918
Garanhuns, Roman Catholic Diocese of
Roman Catholic dioceses and prelatures established in the 20th century